Arturo Mor Roig (14 December 1914-15 July 1974) was an Argentinian politician, who served as Minister of the Interior during the presidency of Alejandro Lanusse. As member of the Radical Civic Union, he was National Deputy elected in Buenos Aires and also served as President of the Chamber of Deputies of Argentina.

He was born in Lleida, Spain, but when he was a child he moved to San Pedro, Argentina with his parents.

He was assassinated by the guerrilla organization Montoneros during the presidency of Isabel Martínez de Perón.

References 

|-

1914 births
1974 deaths
Assassinated Argentine politicians
Members of the Argentine Chamber of Deputies elected in Buenos Aires Province
Presidents of the Argentine Chamber of Deputies
Ministers of Internal Affairs of Argentina
Spanish emigrants to Argentina
Radical Civic Union politicians
People from Lleida